Paradoxophyla is a small genus of microhylid frogs endemic to Madagascar.

Species
Paradoxophyla palmata  – web-foot frog
Paradoxophyla tiarano

References 
 

 
Microhylidae
Amphibian genera